The 2002 Tour of the Basque Country was the 42nd edition of the Tour of the Basque Country cycle race and was held from 8 April to 12 April 2002. The race started in Zalla and finished in Elgoibar. The race was won by Aitor Osa of the iBanesto.com team.

General classification

References

2002
Bas